A bark is a sound most commonly produced from dogs. Other animals that make this noise include, but are not limited to, wolves, coyotes, foxes, seals and barking owls. Woof is the most common onomatopoeia in the English language for this sound. "Bark" is also a verb that describes the sound of many canids. University of Massachusetts Amherst researchers define a bark as a short vocalization.

Definition
While there is not a precise, consistent and functional acoustic definition for barking, researchers may classify barks according to several criteria. University of Massachusetts Amherst researchers define a bark as a short, abrupt vocalization that is relatively loud and high-pitched, changes in frequency, and often repeats rapidly in succession.

In dogs

Dog barking is distinct from wolf barking.  Wolf barks represent only 2.4% of all wolf vocalizations and are described as "rare" occurrences. According to Schassburger, wolves bark only in warning, defense, and protest. In contrast, dogs bark in a wide variety of social situations, with acoustic communication in dogs being described as hypertrophic. Additionally, while wolf barks tend to be brief and isolated, dog barking is often repetitive. Dogs have been known to bark for hours on end.

While a distinct reason for the difference is unknown, a strong hypothesis is that the vocal communication of dogs developed due to their domestication. As evidenced by the farm-fox experiment, the process of domestication alters a breed in more ways than just tameness. Domesticated breeds show vast physical differences from their wild counterparts, notably an evolution that suggests neoteny, or the retention of juvenile characteristics in adults. Adult dogs have, for example, large heads, floppy ears, and shortened snouts – all characteristics seen in wolf puppies. The behavior, too, of adult dogs shows puppy-like characteristics: dogs are submissive, they whine, and they frequently bark. The experiment illustrates how selecting for one trait (in this case, tameness) can create profound by-products, both physical and behavioral.

The frequency of barking in dogs in relation to wolves could also be the product of the very different social environment of dogs. Dogs live in extraordinarily close range with humans, in many societies kept solely as companion animals. From a very young age, humans tend to be one of a dog's primary social contacts. This captive environment presents very different stimuli than would be found by wolves in the wild. While wolves have vast territories, dogs do not. The boundaries of a captive dog's territory will be visited frequently by intruders, thus triggering the bark response as a warning. Additionally, dogs densely populate urban areas, allowing more opportunity to meet new dogs and be social. For example, it is possible that kenneled dogs may have increased barking due to a desire to facilitate social behavior. Dogs' close relationship with humans also renders dogs reliant on humans, even for basic needs. Barking is a way to attract attention, and the behavior is continued by the positive response exhibited by the owners (e.g., if a dog barks to get food and the owner feeds it, the dog is being conditioned to continue said behavior).

Types
Barking in domestic dogs is a controversial topic. While barking is suggested to be "non-communicative," data suggests that it may well be a means of expression that became increasingly sophisticated during domestication. Due to the lack of consensus over whether or not dogs actually communicate using their barks, not much work has been done on categorizing the different types of barking in dogs. That which has been done has been criticized by Feddersen-Petersen as "lack[ing] objectivity." Using sonographic methods, Feddersen-Petersen identified several distinct types of barks, then analyzed them for meanings, functions, and emotions. He separated dog barks into subgroups based on said sonographic data:

Not all breeds demonstrated every subgroup of barking. Instead, significant variance in vocalization was found between different breeds. Poodles showed the least of all barking sub units. Additionally, barking in wolves was observed as notably less diverse. For example, wolf barks are rarely harmonic, tending instead to be noisy.

There is some evidence that humans can determine the suspected emotions of dogs while listening to barks emitted during specific situations. Humans scored the emotions of dogs performing these barks very similarly and in ways that made sense according to the situation at hand. In one example, when subjects were played a recording of a dog tied alone to a tree, a situation in which one could reasonably infer that the dog would be distressed, the human listeners tended to rank the bark as having a high level of despair. It has been suggested that this may be evidence for the idea that dog barks have evolved to be a form of communication with humans specifically, since humans can so readily determine a dog's needs by simply listening to their vocalizations. Further studies have found that the acoustic structure of a bark "[varies] considerably with context." These studies suggest that barks are more than just random sounds, and indeed hold some sort of communicative purpose.

As nuisance

Bark control

Nuisance-barking dogs sound off for no particular reason. "Many dogs bark when they hear other dogs barking," says Katherine A. Houpt, V.M.D., PhD, director of the Cornell Animal Behavior Clinic. Nuisance, inappropriate, or excessive barking comprises between 13 and 35 percent of behavior-problem complaints by dog owners, Houpt noted. The electric collars deliver an irritating shock of adjustable intensity when a vibration sensor in the collar detects barking. The citronella collar releases a spray of citronella when a microphone in the collar senses barking. For the eight dogs that wore both types of collars (one shepherd mix did not complete the study), all owners found the citronella collar to be effective in reducing or stopping nuisance barking and most preferred the fragrance spray. Four out of eight owners said electric shocks had no effect on their dogs—they kept on barking. The citronella collars had problems, Juarbe-D'az noted. One dog owner complained that citronella oil stained the upholstery when the dog, fond of lying about on upholstery, barked. "One owner thought the scent was preferable to her dog's body odor."

Dog barking can be a nuisance and is a common problem that dog owners or their neighbors may face. Different kinds of barking often require different kinds of approach to reduction.

Common approaches are:
 Attempting to understand, and if possible eliminate, the causes of barking.
 Using positive training methods to correct the behavior. Dogs may bark from anxiety or stress, so punishment can often cause problems by reinforcing a cycle of bad behavior. Positive approaches can include:
 Repeated exposure to stimuli whilst calming the dog and persuading it to remain quiet.
 Distraction as the stimulus happens, through treats, praise, or similar.
 Reshaping via clicker training (a form of operant conditioning) or other means to obtain barking behavior on command, and then shaping the control to gain command over silence.
 In her 2008 book Barking: The Sound of a Language, Turid Rugaas explains that barking is a way a dog communicates. She suggests signaling back to show the dog that the dog's attempts to communicate have been acknowledge and to calm a dog down. She suggests the use of a hand signal and a Calming Signal called Splitting. 
 Seeking professional advice from local organizations, dog trainers, or veterinarians.
 Use of a mechanical device such as a bark collar. There are several types, all of which use a collar device that produces a response to barking that the dog notices:
 Citrus spray ("citronella") - dogs as a rule do not like citrus. At the least, it is very noticeable and disrupts the pattern through surprise. These collars spray citrus around the dog's muzzle when it barks. (Sometimes these devices make a "hissing" noise before spraying, as an additional deterrent – see "Combination and escalation devices" below)
 Sonic/ultrasonic (including vibration) - these collars produce a tone which humans may or may not be able to hear, in response to barking. Over time, the sound becomes annoying or distracting enough to deter barking, although this may not always work.
 Electrical - these collars produce a mild stinging or tingling sensation in response to a bark. It is important that such devices have a failsafe mechanism and shut off after a certain time, to prevent ongoing operation.
 Combination and escalation devices - many sound and/or electrical collars have combination or escalation systems. A combination system is one that (for example) uses both sound and spray together. An escalation device is one that uses quiet sounds, or low levels of output, rising gradually until barking ceases. Escalation devices are effective since they "reward" the dog for stopping sooner by not having "all-or-nothing" action, so the dog can learn to react by stopping before much happens.

Note:
 Various bark collars have been both praised and criticized; some are considered inhumane by various people and groups. Electrical devices especially come under criticism by people who consider them torturous and akin to electrocution. However most Societies for the Prevention of Cruelty to Animals agree that in a last resort even an electric collar is better than euthanasia if it comes to an ultimatum, for a stubborn dog that will not stop any other way. It is generally agreed that understanding the communication and retraining by reward is the most effective and most humane way.

Surgical debarking

The controversial surgical procedure known as 'debarking' or 'bark softening' is a veterinary procedure for modifying the voice box so that a barking dog will make a significantly reduced noise. It is considered a last resort by some owners, on the basis that it is better than euthanasia, seizure, or legal problems if the matter has proven incapable of being reliably corrected any other way.

Debarking is illegal in many European states and opposed by animal welfare organizations.

Representation 
Woof is the conventional representation in the English language of the barking of a dog. As with other examples of onomatopoeia or imitative sounds, other cultures "hear" the dog's barks differently and represent them in their own ways. Some of the equivalents of "woof" in other languages are as follows:

 English – woof woof; ruff ruff; arf arf (large dogs and also the sound of sea lions); yap yap; yip yip (small dogs), bow wow, bork bork
 Albanian – 
Armenian – haf haf (հաֆ-հաֆ)
Bulgarian – bau-bau (бау-бау); jaff, jaff (джаф-джаф)
Chinese
Mandarin – wāngwāng (汪汪)
Cantonese –  (㕵㕵)
Croatian – 
Czech – haf, haf
Danish – vov vov; vuf vuf
Dutch – 
Estonian – 
Finnish – 
Filipino – 
French – 
German – 
Greek –  
Hungarian – vau, vau
Icelandic – voff, voff
Indonesian – guk, guk
Italian – 
Japanese –  (ワンワン)
Korean – meong-meong (멍멍), wal-wal (왈왈)
Latvian – vau, vau
Lithuanian – au, au

Persian – haap, haap (هاپ، هاپ)
Polish – hau, hau
Portuguese – au-au; ão-ão; 
Romanian – ham-ham; 
Russian – гав-гав; тяв-тяв ( (small dogs))
Serbian – av-av
Spanish – guau-guau
Swedish – voff; vov vov
Tamil – லொள் லொள் – loL loL
Thai – โฮ่ง โฮ่ง; บ๊อก บ๊อก
Turkish – hav, hav
Ukrainian – гав-гав (hav-hav)
Vietnamese – gâu gâu

Breeds
The Huntaway is a working dog that has been selectively bred to drive stock (usually sheep) by using its voice. It was bred in New Zealand, and is still bred based on ability rather than appearance or lineage.

Naturally "barkless" dog breeds

Compared to most domestic dogs, the bark of a dingo is short and monosyllabic. During observations, the barking of Australian dingoes was shown to have a relatively small variability; sub-groups of bark types, common among domestic dogs, could not be found. Furthermore, only 5% of the observed vocalizations were made up of barking. Australian dingoes bark only in swooshing noises or in a mixture atonal/tonal. Also, barking is almost exclusively used for giving warnings. Warn-barking in a homotypical sequence and a kind of "warn-howling" in a heterotypical sequence has also been observed. The bark-howling starts with several barks and then fades into a rising and ebbing howl and is probably, similarly to coughing, used to warn the puppies and members of the pack. Additionally, dingoes emit a sort of "wailing" sound, which they mostly use when approaching a water hole, probably to warn already present dingoes. According to the present state of knowledge, it is not possible to get Australian dingoes to bark more frequently by making them associate with other domestic dogs. However, Alfred Brehm reported a dingo that completely learned the more "typical" form of barking and knew how to use it, while its brother did not. Whether dingoes bark or bark-howl less frequently in general is not sure.

The now extinct Hare Indian dog of northern Canada was not known to bark in its native homeland, though puppies born in Europe learned how to imitate the barking of other dogs. When hurt or afraid, it howled like a wolf, and when curious, it made a sound described as a growl building up to a howl.

The Basenji of central Africa produces an unusual yodel-like sound, due to its unusually shaped larynx. This trait also gives the Basenji the nickname "Barkless Dog."

Barking in other animals
Besides dogs and wolves, other canines like coyotes and jackals can bark. Their barks are quite similar to those of wolves and dogs. The bark of a dingo is short and monosyllabic.

The warning bark of a fox is higher and more drawn out than barks of other canids.

There are non-canine species with vocalizations that are sometimes described as barking. Because the alarm call of the muntjac resembles a dog's bark, they are sometimes known as "barking deer". Eared seals are also known to bark. Prairie dogs employ a complex form of communication that involves barks and rhythmic chirps. A wide variety of bird species produce vocalizations that include the canonical features of barking, especially when avoiding predators. Some primate species, notably gorillas, can and do vocalize in short barks.

See also
 Animal communication
 Debarking
 Dog communication
 Dog training
 Growling
 Howling

References

External links
 "Article from ASPCA's Virtual Pet Behaviorist on working with barking problems"

Animal sounds
Dog training and behavior